"Heart of the Sunrise" is a progressive rock song by British band Yes. It is the closing track on their fourth album, 1971's Fragile. The compositional credits go to Jon Anderson, Bill Bruford, and Chris Squire, though keyboardist Rick Wakeman contributed some uncredited sections.

The song eventually rose to become the band's fifth most-played song, and appears on Yessongs, Classic Yes, In a Word: Yes (1969–), and many other studio and live retrospectives. The song was featured in the 1998 comedy-drama film Buffalo '66.

Meaning
According to Anderson, the song is about being lost in the city. This was explained on many tours. In the Big Generator (1987) tour, Anderson said that the song is about the power and energy of the sunrise. In 1978, however, he had said that the song was about the power of love. Sometimes, he made other comments regarding its meaning. For example, in the 16 October 1971 show, Anderson stated that the organ in the song is inaudible and that the song will be performed without it. He further noted that the organ is "one of the best jokes in the business."

Content and structure
The song begins with a long introduction, with over three and half minutes of instrumental playing before the vocals begin. It incorporates multiple time signatures. After one full sequence, it merges into a new, slightly funky section in  that lasts for a minute and a half. It afterwards breaks back into three full cycles of the main riff.

At around 3:25, after the final cycle, the song switches to a much softer style, where Jon Anderson begins singing. This section starts in  but includes many individual sequences, including a quirky  riff that appears in various speeds and arrangements. The song gradually builds in intensity, eventually including the main riff interspersed with the other sections. A brief  classical snippet of Rick Wakeman's is used as well in both classical and rock arrangements.

The song itself ends very abruptly around 10:35, but a reprise of "We Have Heaven" from earlier on the album is included as a hidden track, extending it to 11:27 (11:32 on the 2003 release). Some vinyl pressings of the album, as well as most pre-recorded tape editions, end without this reprise. At either length, it is the longest song on the album. Original North American pressings of Fragile contain the reprise, but list "Heart of the Sunrise"'s timing as 10:34, not reflecting its inclusion.

Squire wrote the song's main riff, which has similarities to the one from King Crimson's "21st Century Schizoid Man."

Rick Wakeman contributed to the writing of "Heart of the Sunrise" (and fellow album piece "South Side of the Sky") by adding piano interludes to both songs, but was not credited because of contractual conflicts. He was instead promised more money by Atlantic studio executives, which he claims he never saw.

Reception
Ultimate Classic Rock critic Ryan Reed described the song as being Yes' 3rd heaviest song saying that it "[utilizes] a chromatic, King Crimson-inspired bass riff and gothic blasts of mellotron" and that "there's light here, too, but the dark is midnight-black."

Yes drummer Bill Bruford claimed that "the band hit its real template" with the song, commenting on its "drama" and "poise".  Anderson and Squire have both referred to it as one of their favorite Yes songs.

Live versions

A number of live versions were released:
 Yessongs (Close to the Edge Tour)
 Progeny: Seven Shows from Seventy-Two (Close to the Edge Tour)
 Yes – Symphonic Live, 2002, (Heineken Music Hall, Amsterdam)
 The Word is Live (Tormato Tour)
 Yesyears (Big Generator Tour)
 An Evening of Yes Music Plus (Performed by Anderson Bruford Wakeman Howe, on their tour)
 Live at Montreux 2003 (Full Circle Tour)
 Union Live (Union Tour)
 In the Present – Live from Lyon (In the Present Tour)
 Like It Is: Yes at the Mesa Arts Center (Heaven & Earth Tour)

When performed live, the song was mostly performed the same as the studio version, accounting for obvious differences in instrumentation. Of course, the introductions changed as well. In the early part of the Big Generator tour, the main riff was worked into an instrumental version of "Almost Like Love", which led off the show.

Progressive metal band Dream Theater paid tribute to Yes with a live cover of this song, which is included on their Uncovered 2003-2005 official bootleg.

Dance punk band LCD Soundsystem also paid tribute to this song during what was promoted as their final performance, blending it into their song "Tired".

Lizzo's band performed the opening riff as an introduction to "Boys" while touring in support of Special.

Personnel
Jon Anderson – lead vocals
Steve Howe – electric guitars, backing vocals
Chris Squire – bass guitar, backing vocals
Rick Wakeman – Hammond organ, Mellotron, Minimoog, grand piano
Bill Bruford – drums, percussion

References

1971 songs
Yes (band) songs
Songs written by Bill Bruford
Songs written by Jon Anderson
Songs written by Chris Squire
Song recordings produced by Eddy Offord